Thomas Noel O'Gorman (born December 1945) is an Irish former hurler. At club level he played with Newport and was also a member of the Tipperary senior hurling team.

Career

O'Gorman first played hurling at juvenile and underage levels with the Newport club. He progressed to adult level and was part of the Newport team that won the North Tipperary IHC title in 1965. O'Gorman later served as a coach at various levels with the club.

O'Gorman never played at minor with Tipperary but spent three consecutive seasons with the under-21 team, including one as team captain. He was at full-back on the first Tipperary team to win an All-Ireland U21HC title in 1964. O'Gorman quickly joined the senior team and was an unused substitute for the 1965 All-Ireland final defeat of Wexford. A year with the intermediate team yielded All-Ireland success in 1966. O'Gorman won consecutive Munster SHC medals on the field of play in 1967 and 1968, however, Tipperary suffered consecutive All-Ireland final defeats to Kilkenny and Wexford.

Honours

Newport
North Tipperary Intermediate Hurling Championship: 1965

Tipperary
All-Ireland Senior Hurling Championship: 1965
Munster Senior Hurling Championship: 1965, 1967, 1968
National Hurling League: 1964-65, 1967-68
All-Ireland Intermediate Hurling Championship: 1966
Munster Intermediate Hurling Championship: 1966
All-Ireland Under-21 Hurling Championship: 1964
Munster Under-21 Hurling Championship: 1964, 1965

References

External link

 Noel O'Gorman player profile

1945 births
Living people
Newport hurlers
Tipperary inter-county hurlers
Munster inter-provincial hurlers